Sha Kok Estate is a public housing estate in Sha Tin Wai, Sha Tin, New Territories, Hong Kong near Pok Hong Estate, Jat Min Chuen and Sha Tin Wai station. The estate consists of seven residential blocks completed between 1980 and 1982. The blocks in the estate are named after birds.

Yue Shing Court is a Home Ownership Scheme court in Sha Tin, near Sha Kok Estate and Jat Min Chuen. It consists of four residential blocks built in 1980.

Houses

Sha Kok Estate

Yue Shing Court

Demographics
According to the 2016 by-census, Sha Kok Estate had a population of 14,522. The median age was 52.9 and the majority of residents (97.9 per cent) were of Chinese ethnicity. The average household size was 2.4 people. The median monthly household income of all households (i.e. including both economically active and inactive households) was HK$18,000.

Politics
Sha Kok Estate and Yue Shing Court are located in Sha Kok constituency of the Sha Tin District Council. It was formerly represented by Billy Chan Shiu-yeung, who was elected in the 2019 elections until July 2021.

See also

Public housing estates in Sha Tin

References

Residential buildings completed in 1980
Residential buildings completed in 1981
Residential buildings completed in 1982
Sha Tin District
Public housing estates in Hong Kong
1980 establishments in Hong Kong